The Cultural Palace of Nationalities (民族文化宫) is located in Beijing's Xicheng District, on West Chang'an Avenue. Built in September 1959, it is one of the Ten Great Buildings and was registered as the first of 55 museums in the city. The building houses a museum, an art gallery, a library, an art institute, a theater, a guesthouse, and other facilities. It is under the administration of the State Ethnic Affairs Commission of the People's Republic of China.

Architecture 
The Cultural Palace of Nationalities was built by the master of contemporary Chinese architecture Zhang Bo, whose well-known works include the Great Hall, Beijing Hotel, Friendship Hotel and Diaoyutai State Guesthouse. It covers 32,000 m². The main building has 13 floors and is 67 meters high. The east and west sides are surrounded by wings, with a central exhibition hall extending north. The exterior is predominantly white, with peacock-blue glazed tile roof eaves. Characters over its entrance spell "solidarity" and "progress."

Function 
The mission of the Culture Palace is to serve and educate the various minority cultures of the country. The collection of National Culture Palace includes over 60 million literature and science text books. The basic display for the "Chinese Traditional Culture Series" exhibition, and theater performances will be from time to time various national art. In recent years, the building also provides exhibition space to other types of exhibitions organized.

In 1979, the National Palace Museum changed its name to the National Palace Hall. The museum's collection contains cultural relics of ethnic minorities in China to promote minority cultures. Large collections of arts and crafts, costumes, musical instruments, and religious articles show the culture of the Chinese of all ethnic groups, and witness the historical development of all ethnic groups. 

Buildings and structures completed in 1959
Buildings and structures in Beijing
Museums in Beijing
Ethnic museums in China
Xicheng District